Agnes Elizabeth Slack or Agnes Elizabeth Saunders (15 October 1858 – 16 January 1946) was a leading English Temperance advocate.

Life
Slack was born in Ripley, Derbyshire in 1858. Her Liberal Wesleyan Methodist parents were Mary Ann (born Bamford) and Thomas Slack. Her father made bricks and her elder brother, John Bamford Slack, would become a minister and politician. At the age of 14 she was sent to a boarding school in Lincoln. Methodists believed in temperance and religion was Slack's life's work.

In 1895 she became the secretary of the National British Temperance Women's Association and the World's Women's Christian Temperance Union.

Slack had good connections with American Woman's Christian Temperance Union and she referred to their President, Lillian Stevens as "mother". She continued her education afterwards attending summer schools at Oxford and Cambridge in bible studies before the first world war. During this time she established strong links with the American vice-President Anna Adams Gordon in Boston. Gordon became the President of the Woman's Christian Temperance Union when Stevens died in 1914. In 1920 the USA banned alcohol.

In 1925 there were two women's temperance organisation's in the UK, because of a disagreement over the suffrage movement in 1893. She was the last President of the National British Temperance Women's Association until it merged with the Women's Total Abstinence Union. As a result, she was the founding President of the National British Women's Total Abstinence Union. The following year, her niece Aelfrida Tillyard, published the first biography of her life, documenting her travels to Canada, America, Scandinavia and South Africa. In the same year she became the first woman to preach at Wesley's Chapel.

Slack married an architect named Charles Saunders in 1943 and she died in Kettering in 1946.

Books
“Agnes E. Slack” (“Two Hundred Thousand Miles Travel for Temperance in Four Continents”) by Aelfrida Tillyard, 1926. Published by W. Heffer & Sons Ltd, Cambridge, England.
Slack, A. E. (1908), My travels in India, published by John Heywood Ltd, Manchester, England.
People I have met and places I have seen: some memories of Agnes E. Slack, 1942

References

1858 births
1946 deaths
People from Ripley, Derbyshire
British activists
British women activists
Woman's Christian Temperance Union people
20th-century British non-fiction writers
British travel writers
British memoirists
20th-century British women writers
British women memoirists
British women travel writers